The  North Carolina lunar sample displays   are part of two commemorative plaques consisting of small fragments of Moon specimen brought back with the Apollo 11 and Apollo 17 lunar missions and given in the 1970s to the people of the state of North Carolina by United States President Richard Nixon as goodwill gifts.

Description

Apollo 11

Apollo 17

History 
 
The North Carolina Apollo 17 "goodwill Moon rocks" plaque display that was given to the state of North Carolina in 1973 was found in a drawer at the North Carolina Department of Commerce when a new employee came across it in a desk drawer in his new office. The new employee was a colleague of Christopher Brown, professor at North Carolina State University, and loaned the display to Brown. In 2010 Brown presented it to the North Carolina Museum of Natural Sciences for public exhibition in the museum's new wing, where the North Carolina Apollo 11 lunar sample plaque display was already on display.

The Apollo 11 sample display is in the collection of the North Carolina Museum of History in Raleigh.  It is not on public exhibition.

See also
 List of Apollo lunar sample displays

References

External links

Stolen and missing moon rocks
Tourist attractions in North Carolina